Štefan Zaťko (born 21 May 1962) is a Slovak football manager and manages Pohronie on a caretaker basis.

Zaťko has coached TSG Kälberau, Matador Púchov, Slovan Bratislava and Čadca, as well as Dukla Banská Bystrica.

References 

1962 births
Living people
Czechoslovak footballers
Slovak football managers
Association footballers not categorized by position
FK Fotbal Třinec players
MŠK Považská Bystrica (football) players
MFK Topvar Topoľčany managers
ŠK Slovan Bratislava managers
FK Dukla Banská Bystrica managers
FC DAC 1904 Dunajská Streda managers
MŠK Púchov managers
TJ Sokol Dolná Ždaňa managers
FK Pohronie managers
MFK Tatran Liptovský Mikuláš managers
Slovak Super Liga managers
2. Liga (Slovakia) managers
3. Liga (Slovakia) managers
Expatriate football managers in Austria
Slovak expatriate sportspeople in Austria